Etheredge is a surname. Notable people with the surname include:

Forest Etheredge (1929–2004), American educator and politician
M. B. Etheredge (1915–2014), American World War II veteran
Warren Etheredge, American interviewer, educator and film producer

more info here
http://etheredge.ws/